Rendu Pondatti Kaavalkaaran is a 1992 Indian Tamil language comedy film directed by Relangi Narasimha Rao. The film stars Anand Babu in a dual role, Rohini, Vaidehi and Devipriya. It was released on 7 February 1992. The film was a remake of director's own Telugu film Iddaru Pellala Muddula Police.

Plot 

Krishnan is an honest police constable who has two wives Rukmini and Satyabhama. However, his two wives hate each other. Krishnan is transferred to another city because of his honesty and the fact that he often refuses to do his superiors drudgery.

In the past, Krishnan married Rukmini who thought that he was a Sub-inspector of police. When she realized his real job, she left him alone. In the meantime, Krishnan and his neighbour Satyabhama fell in love with each other. They had sexual intercourse. Then Satyabhama begged Rukmini to help her and Satyabhama married Krishnan.

Fed up with the transfers, Krishnan throws away his police uniform and becomes a pickpocket. Anand, Krishnan's look-alike, takes his identity and becomes a police constable. Soon, Anand must juggle between Krishnan's two wives while Krishnan must manage Anand's girlfriend Lalitha.

Cast 

Anand Babu as Krishnan and Anand
Rohini as Rukmini
Vaidehi as Satyabhama
Devipriya as Lalitha
Janagaraj as Muthusamy
Senthil
Y. Vijaya as Mangalam
Sri Lakshmi
Loose Mohan
Omakuchi Narasimhan
Typist Gopu

Soundtrack 

The film score and the soundtrack were composed by Raj–Koti. The soundtrack, released in 1992, features 4 tracks with lyrics written by Vairamuthu.

Reception
Sundarji of Kalki wrote that viewers could enjoy the film if they forget logic.

References

External links 
 

1990s Tamil-language films
1992 comedy films
1992 films
Films directed by Relangi Narasimha Rao
Films scored by Raj–Koti
Indian comedy films
Tamil remakes of Telugu films